Following is a list of senators of Saint Martin, people who have represented the collectivity of Saint Martin in the Senate of France. The lone senate seat representing Saint Martin was created in 2008. The senator serves a six-year term.

Election process
The Senator from Saint Martin is elected by an electoral college consisting of the members of the Territorial Council of Saint Martin and the deputy of the French National Assembly representing Saint Barthélemy and Saint-Martin's 1st constituency. If no candidate receives a majority, a second round is held to determine the winner.

Fifth Republic 
Senators for Saint Martin under the French Fifth Republic were:

References

Sources

 
Lists of members of the Senate (France) by department